Dichomeris siranta is a moth in the family Gelechiidae. It was described by Edward Meyrick in 1913. It is found in Assam, India.

The forewings are ochreous, sometimes tinged with fuscous and with the costal edge fuscous. The stigmata are dark fuscous, the first discal conspicuous, others little marked, the plical somewhat beyond the first discal. There is a narrow fuscous terminal fascia, widest beneath the apex and narrowed to the tornus. There is also an interrupted dark fuscous terminal line. The hindwings are dark grey.

References

Moths described in 1913
siranta